Ellwood H. May Environmental Park (known as Maywood) is a  city-owned park in Sheboygan, Wisconsin. The park offers hiking and skiing trails and is open 365-days a year.

The park shares a common border with Evergreen Park to the south.

Wildlife 
Deer can be often spotted throughout the park. A butterfly and hummingbird garden is located in the park. Habitats vary over park from restored prairie to old-field, hardwood forest, ponds, mixed woods and the Pigeon River.

Ecology Center 
The recently built Ecology Center provides hands-on educational opportunities for students and the general public. The center holds science programs, summer camps and public events. Observation Bee Hive is located within the Ecology Center.

Maywood Earth Ride 
The Maywood Earth Ride is an annual non-competitive event for bicycle riders of all ages and abilities. The Earth Ride is not a race and the course is not closed. The annual event rises funds for maintenance of the park.

References

External links 
 Ellwood H. May Environmental Park

Parks in Wisconsin
Sheboygan, Wisconsin